The Dawn Trail is a 1930 American Western film, directed by Christy Cabanne. It stars Marceline Day, Miriam Seegar, and Charles Morton, and was released on November 28, 1930. It was remade as the 1939 film Texas Stampede.

Cast list
 Buck Jones as Larry
 Miriam Seegar as June
 Charles Morton as Mart
 Erville Alderson as Denton
 Edward J. Le Saint as Amos
 Charles King as Skeets
 Hank Mann as Cock Eye
 Vester Pegg as Mac
 Slim Whitaker as Steve
 Charles Brinley as Nestor

References

External links 
 
 
 

Films directed by Christy Cabanne
Columbia Pictures films
American Western (genre) films
1930 Western (genre) films
1930 films
American black-and-white films
1930s English-language films
1930s American films